Pontsiân is a village in the county of Ceredigion, Wales. It lies on the banks of the river Cletwr, a minor tributary to the Afon Teifi.

Located in a rural area, the main industry is agriculture. The village itself has a popular primary school, along with a village shop (branded as 'PREMIER') and a village hall.

Villages in Ceredigion
Llandysul